The First Night is a 1927 American silent comedy film directed by Richard Thorpe and starring Bert Lytell, Dorothy Devore and Harry Myers. It was produced and distributed by the independent Tiffany Pictures. The film's sets were designed by the art director Edwin B. Willis.

Synopsis
When a couple announce an engagement, they are both confronted by former associates who claim that they are either married or engaged already. They decide to elope, but things do not go entirely to plan.

Cast
 Bert Lytell as	Dr. Richard Bard
 Dorothy Devore as Doris Frazer
 Harry Myers as 	Hotel Detective
 Frederick Ko Vert as Mimi / Jack White
 Walter Hiers as 	Mr. Cleveland
 Lila Leslie as Mrs. Cleveland
 James T. Mack as 	The Drunk
 Hazel Keener as Miss Leeds
 Joan Standing as Mrs. Miller

References

Bibliography
 Munden, Kenneth White. The American Film Institute Catalog of Motion Pictures Produced in the United States, Part 1. University of California Press, 1997.

External links
 

1927 films
1927 comedy films
1920s English-language films
American silent feature films
Silent American comedy films
American black-and-white films
Films directed by Richard Thorpe
Tiffany Pictures films
1920s American films